Athol Charles Meech (March 28, 1907 – August 2, 1981) was a Canadian rower, born in Ottawa, who competed in the 1928 Summer Olympics.

In 1928 he won the bronze medal as member of the Canadian boat in the eights competition.

External links
 profile

1907 births
1981 deaths
Rowers from Ottawa
Canadian male rowers
Olympic rowers of Canada
Rowers at the 1928 Summer Olympics
Olympic bronze medalists for Canada
Olympic medalists in rowing
Medalists at the 1928 Summer Olympics